Emmanuel Martínez may refer to:

Emmanuel Martínez (footballer, born 1989), Argentine football defender
Emmanuel Martínez (footballer, born 1994), Argentine football winger and forward